Do It All was a British DIY chain

Do It All may also refer to:
Do It All (album) Michael Henderson
"Do It All", song by Michael Henderson
"Do It All", song by Tyga